Golf With Stan Leonard was a Canadian educational sports television series which aired on CBC Television from 1960 to 1962, and in 1965.

Premise
This was an instructional series in the game, hosted by professional golfer Stan Leonard and sportscaster Ted Reynolds. Episodes were recorded at the Point Grey Golf Course in Vancouver.

Scheduling
The first season consisted of 15-minute episodes aired Saturdays at 6:30 p.m. (Eastern) from 2 April to 25 June 1960. The second season was broadcast Wednesdays at 7:45 p.m. from 5 July to 13 September 1961. The third season returned to the Saturday 6:30 p.m. time slot from 7 April to 30 June 1962. Three years later the final season was expanded to a half-hour time slot, airing Sundays at 5:00 p.m. from 4 July to 26 September 1965.

References

External links
 
Golf with Stan Leonard - Canadian Communication Foundation

CBC Television original programming
1960 Canadian television series debuts
1965 Canadian television series endings